Miantang or Miyantang may refer to:

Miantang-e Olya
Miantang-e Sofla
Miyantang-e Mansuri

See also
Mian Tang (disambiguation)